The Barcelona School of Informatics is one of the schools of the Universitat Politècnica de Catalunya (Technical University of Catalonia), Spain. It was created in 1976, four years after the establishment of the university.

It is located in the north campus, and is the main school for computer science degrees.

References

External links 
 

Education in Barcelona
Schools of informatics
Polytechnic University of Catalonia